Bernardo Doroteo Reyes Ogazón (30 August 1850 – 9 February 1913) was a Mexican general and politician, with aspirations to be President of Mexico. He died in a coup d'état against President Francisco I. Madero.  Born in a prominent liberal family in the western state of Jalisco, he served in the army, rising to the rank of general. Like his political patron, General and then President Porfirio Díaz, Reyes was a military man who became an able administrator. Reyes was one of the state governors that Díaz appointed, serving as governor of the northern state of Nuevo León. He implemented Porfirian policy, particularly eliminating political rivals, but also building his own power base. He helped in the modernization of that state, enabling local industrialization, improving public education and health, and supporting improvements in the lives of workers.  While governor of Nuevo León, Reyes approved a workers compensation law.   Followers of Reyes were known as Reyistas.

Reyes served in the cabinet for two years as Minister of War, and there he created an expanded military force, the Second Reserve which had some 30,000 men and a significant budget.  The force came to be considered Reyes's private army by the Cientificos. Reyes was emerging as a counterweight to the influence of the Científicos. As Díaz aged and the presidential succession became an open topic of discussion, he was emerging as a potential candidate. Díaz disbanded the Second Reserve and Reyes returned to Nuevo León as governor, and his popularity grew.  A way to manage the presidential succession would have been to have a viable candidate run in the 1910 elections as Díaz's vice president. Clubs supporting Reyes were organized in a number of major cities, although Reyes himself did not openly court political power and actively supported Díaz's run for the presidency despite his published statement that he was not going to seek re-election.

The center of Reyes's political power was in his home state of Jalisco; Díaz's supporters closed Reyes clubs and jailed their leaders. His main support came from the middle class, many of whom had connections to the now disbanded Second Reserve. Reyes was seen as a reformer, anti-Científico, pro-business, with a strong following among professionals such as doctors and lawyers, and a viable candidate of the old order with both military and political experience who could manage a presidential transition. He was not an outsider or radical agitator.

Together with José Yves Limantour, he was considered one of the potential successors of Porfirio Díaz.  With Francisco Madero's latter challenge to the dictator in the 1910 elections and, afterwards, initiation of the Mexican Revolution, previous notions of who should succeed Díaz were discarded.

For a time Reyes was a supporter of Madero, but he later led the first rebellion against Madero.  After this rebellion failed, Reyes was imprisoned in the Mexico City prison of Santiago Tlatelolco. General Félix Díaz was imprisoned at another Mexico City jail for rebellion, but the two were able to easily communicate despite that and plot a joint coup against Madero. They tried to get General Victoriano Huerta to join the plot, but he declined, despite Huerta's being a protégé of Reyes's.  General Manuel Mondragón sent forces to free Reyes from jail on 9 February 1913, who freed Reyes from prison.  Then, they marched on to the National Palace in the beginning of the Ten Tragic Days.  Reyes was killed on day 1 of the coup, in an assault on the palace. He had expected to enter the National Palace and declare Madero ousted. Before he could enter the building, Reyes was shot dead along with 400 others, among them civilians.

He was the father of the writer Alfonso Reyes, and grandfather of the painter Aurora Reyes.

References

External links

  
 IEA:Bernardo Reyes 

1850 births
1913 deaths
People from Guadalajara, Jalisco
Mexican generals
Governors of Nuevo León
People of the Mexican Revolution
Porfiriato